Javier Felipe Espinoza Ayaipoma is a Peruvian politician. He was Progresemos Perú's presidential candidate for the 2006 national election. He received 0.1% of the vote, coming in 16th place.

External links
Progresemos Perú's site 

Living people
Let's Make Progress Peru politicians
Candidates for President of Peru
Year of birth missing (living people)
Place of birth missing (living people)
21st-century Peruvian politicians